Dacorum Borough Council in Hertfordshire, England is elected every four years. Since the last boundary changes in 2007, 51 councillors have been elected from 25 wards.

Political control
Since the first election to the council in 1973 political control of the council has been held by the following parties:

Leadership
The leader of the council since 1999 has been:

Council elections
1973 Dacorum District Council election
1976 Dacorum District Council election
1979 Dacorum District Council election (New ward boundaries)
1983 Dacorum District Council election
1987 Dacorum Borough Council election (Borough boundary changes took place but the number of seats remained the same)
1991 Dacorum Borough Council election (Borough boundary changes took place but the number of seats remained the same)
1995 Dacorum Borough Council election
1999 Dacorum Borough Council election (New ward boundaries reduced the number of seats by 6)
2003 Dacorum Borough Council election
2007 Dacorum Borough Council election (New ward boundaries reduced the number of seats by 1)
2011 Dacorum Borough Council election
2015 Dacorum Borough Council election
2019 Dacorum Borough Council election

By-election results

1995–1999

1999–2003

2003–2007

2007–2011

2011–2015

Vacancy caused by resignation of Conservative incumbent Stephen Holmes.

Vacancy caused by resignation of Labour incumbent. Percentage changes are since May 2011

2015–present

References

 By-election results

External links
Dacorum Borough Council

 
Local elections
Council elections in Hertfordshire
District council elections in England